The Myanmar Ambassador in Berlin is the official representative of the Government in Naypyidaw to the Government of Germany.
Since January 30, 1986, she is concurrently as Myanmar Ambassador to the Czech Republic in Pargue coacredited.

History
Since 1989 Union of Myanmar 
From  to  the Burmese Ambassador in Bonn was concurrently Myanmar Ambassador to Austria.
From  to  the Burmese Ambassador in Bonn was concurrently Myanmar Ambassador to Belgium.

List of representatives

References 

 
Germany
Myanmar